Yo maté a Facundo is a 1975 Argentine drama film directed by Hugo del Carril. The plot is a fictional account about Argentine outlaw Santos Pérez, leader of the gang which murdered Rioja's caudillo Facundo Quiroga in 1835.

Cast
 Federico Luppi as Santos Pérez
 José María Gutiérrez as Juncos
 Norma Sebre as Rosario
 Carlos Cores as Facundo Quiroga

External links
 

1975 films
Argentine drama films
Films directed by Hugo del Carril
1970s Spanish-language films
Works about the Argentine Civil War
1970s Argentine films